Emerald skink may refer to:

Lamprolepis,  the emerald skinks
Dasia, commonly known as tree skinks

Animal common name disambiguation pages